Roger Kennedy Jorgensen (September 2, 1920 – October 3, 2010) was an American professional basketball player. He was the brother of former NBA player Noble Jorgensen.

Jorgensen played with the Pittsburgh Ironmen of the Basketball Association of America from 1946 to 1947. He played at the collegiate level at the University of Pittsburgh and Ohio State University.

BAA career statistics

Regular season

References

External links
 

1920 births
2010 deaths
American men's basketball players
Centers (basketball)
Forwards (basketball)
Pittsburgh Ironmen players
Pittsburgh Panthers men's basketball players
Ohio State Buckeyes men's basketball players
Undrafted National Basketball Association players